Neodiplothele is a genus of South American brushed trapdoor spiders first described by Cândido Firmino de Mello-Leitão in 1917.

Species
 it contains 9 species, all found in Brazil:
Neodiplothele aureus Gonzalez-Filho, Lucas & Brescovit, 2015 – Brazil
Neodiplothele caucaia Gonzalez-Filho, Lucas & Brescovit, 2015 – Brazil
Neodiplothele flavicoma (Simon, 1891) – Brazil
Neodiplothele fluminensis Mello-Leitão, 1924 – Brazil
Neodiplothele indicattii Gonzalez-Filho, Lucas & Brescovit, 2015 – Brazil
Neodiplothele irregularis Mello-Leitão, 1917 (type) – Brazil
Neodiplothele itabaiana Gonzalez-Filho, Lucas & Brescovit, 2015 – Brazil
Neodiplothele martinsi Gonzalez-Filho, Lucas & Brescovit, 2015 – Brazil
Neodiplothele picta Vellard, 1924 – Brazil

References

Barychelidae
Mygalomorphae genera
Spiders of Brazil
Taxa named by Cândido Firmino de Mello-Leitão